Risto Syrjänen (4 June 1925 – 8 January 2016) was a Finnish hurdler. He competed in the men's 110 metres hurdles at the 1952 Summer Olympics.

References

1925 births
2016 deaths
Athletes (track and field) at the 1952 Summer Olympics
Finnish male hurdlers
Olympic athletes of Finland
Place of birth missing